Kolomiets (also Kolomiyets) is a patronymic surname of Slavic origin. Notable people with the surname include:

 Inna Kolomiets (1921–2005), Ukrainian sculptor
 Marina Kolomiets (born 1972), Russian footballer
 Olga Kolomiyets (born 1973),  Ukrainian volleyball player
 Trofim Kolomiets (1894–1971), Soviet Army commander

See also
 
 

Ukrainian-language surnames
Surnames of Ukrainian origin
Patronymic surnames